Stanley Wagner may refer to:
 Stanley Wagner (ice hockey)
 Stanley Wagner (winemaker)
 Stanley M. Wagner, American rabbi and academic